Tell No Lies may refer to:
Tell No Lies, a novel by Gregg Hurwitz
"Tell No Lies", a song by Spoons from the Listen to the City soundtrack
"Tell No Lies", a song by Gotthard from the album Open